General elections were held in Niue on 9 April 1966.

Campaign
Five of the fourteen seats in the Legislative Assembly had only a single candidate, with the other nine constituencies seeing a contest between two and four candidates.

Results

Aftermath
Following the elections, Robert Rex was elected as Leader of Government Business on 26 April. Siakisoni, Strickland and Talipule were also elected onto the Executive Council. A Member System was introduced later in the year, with Rex becoming responsible for Public Works and Electricity, Siakisoni for Police and Prison Affairs, Strickland for Radio and Telephone Services and Talipule for the Post Office.

References

Niue
Elections in Niue
1966 in Niue
April 1966 events in Oceania